Bonfilsia is a genus of beetles in the family Cerambycidae, containing the following species:

 Bonfilsia pejoti Chalumeau & Touroult, 2004
 Bonfilsia tricolor Villiers, 1979

References

Tillomorphini